Shakarimi is a Persian language surname. Notable people with the surname include:

 Jahanshir Shakarami, Iranian entomologist
 Masoud Shakarami (1986), Iranian actor
 Nika Shakarami (2005–2022), Iranian teenage protester who participated in Iran's 2022 nationwide protests

Persian-language surnames